Tsai Cheng-fu (14 October 1929 – 13 July 2016) was a Taiwanese hurdler who competed in the 1956 Summer Olympics. He was also the 400 metres hurdles champion at the 1958 Asian Games.

References

External links
 

1929 births
2016 deaths
Taiwanese male hurdlers
Olympic athletes of Taiwan
Athletes (track and field) at the 1956 Summer Olympics
Asian Games gold medalists for Chinese Taipei
Asian Games silver medalists for Chinese Taipei
Asian Games medalists in athletics (track and field)
Athletes (track and field) at the 1958 Asian Games
Medalists at the 1958 Asian Games
20th-century Taiwanese people